Azmi bin Khalid (Jawi: بيسريء @ عزمي بن خالد; born 13 December 1940) is a former member of the Parliament of Malaysia. He represented the constituency of Padang Besar in Perlis. He was also a minister in the federal Cabinet from 1999 to 2008, as a member of the United Malay National Organisation (UMNO) in the then-ruling Barisan Nasional coalition.

Tan Sri Azmi's first ministerial appointment was as Minister of Rural Development, becoming the first Cabinet minister from Perlis. He became the Minister of Home Affairs in 2004, before moving to the Ministry of Natural Resources and Environment in 2006. He lost his Cabinet position after the 2008 election for reasons tied to his involvement in political disruption in Perlis. He did not re-contest Padang Besar in the 2013 election.

In 2005, Azmi married television personality Normala Shamsuddin. He has four children to his late wife Yasmin Abdullah.

Election results

Honours

Honours of Malaysia
  :
  Commander of the Order of Loyalty to the Crown of Malaysia (PSM) – Tan Sri (2013)
  :
  Grand Commander of the Exalted Order of Malacca (DGSM) – Datuk Seri (2007)
  :
  Grand Knight of the Order of the Crown of Pahang (SIMP) – formerly Dato', now Dato' Indera (2000)
  :
  Knight Commander of the Order of the Crown of Perlis (DPMP) – Dato' (1996)
  Knight Grand Commander of the Order of the Crown of Perlis (SPMP) – Dato' Seri (2005)

References

 
 
 

Living people
1940 births
People from Perlis
United Malays National Organisation politicians
Malaysian people of Malay descent
Malaysian Muslims
Members of the Dewan Rakyat
Government ministers of Malaysia
Commanders of the Order of Loyalty to the Crown of Malaysia
Home ministers of Malaysia